J. Horace McFarland (1859–1948) from McAlisterville, Pennsylvania was a leading proponent of the "City Beautiful Movement" in the United States.

Life
McFarland was the son of Union Civil War colonel George F. McFarland. He lived and worked most of his adult life in Harrisburg, Pennsylvania, residing at an estate he named Breeze Hill in the Bellevue Park area of the city. At the estate, McFarland established gardens that featured numerous trees, vegetables, and, most prominently, roses. Photos of his famous gardens reside in the Smithsonian institution. McFarland served as president of the American Civic Association (ACA) from 1904 to 1924 and the American Rose Society. McFarland and the ACA were a major force promoting civic improvement, environmental conservation, and beautification in the United States. McFarland helped organize the defense of Niagara Falls from development efforts by power companies, worked to protect Yosemite National Park with the famous environmental preservationist John Muir, who has been hailed as the father of the National Park Service.

He is remembered for a statement at the first Conference of Governors held at the White House, Washington D.C., in 1908:

His papers are held at the Pennsylvania State Archives.

References

People from Juniata County, Pennsylvania
American environmentalists
1859 births
1948 deaths